Marjory Stoneman Douglas High School (MSDH or MSD) is a public high school in Parkland, Florida, United States. It was established in 1990 and is part of the Broward County Public Schools district. It is named after the writer Marjory Stoneman Douglas and is the only public high school in Parkland, serving almost all of the limits of that city as well as a section of Coral Springs.

On February 14, 2018, Marjory Stoneman Douglas High School was the scene of a  deadly mass shooting perpetrated by a  19-year-old former student of the school, that murdered  17 people and left 17 other people with injuries.

History 
Marjory Stoneman Douglas High School was named after the Everglades environmentalist, Marjory Stoneman Douglas. The school is located just under two miles from the Everglades National Park, on part of the historical Everglades for which Marjory Stoneman Douglas advocated. The school opened in 1990, the year of her centennial, with students in grades 9 through 11, most of whom transferred from nearby schools Coral Springs High School and J. P. Taravella High School. The first senior class graduated in 1992.

Shooting 

On February 14, 2018, a mass shooting at the campus perpetrated by a 19-year-old former student of the school armed with a semi-automatic AR-15 style rifle left 17 dead and 17 more wounded in less than six minutes. The gunman was apprehended hours later. It is the deadliest high school shooting in the United States, surpassing the Columbine High School massacre on April 20, 1999. In 2016, a Marjory Stoneman Douglas High School school resource Broward County Sheriff's Office deputy had an investigator for the Florida Department of Children and Families speak to the defendant, but the defendant's therapist said that he was "not currently a threat to himself or others" and did not need to be committed. A mental health counselor said the defendant did not meet the criteria under Florida law that allows the police to commit a mentally ill person against their will. Stoneman Douglas High School conducted a "threat assessment" on the defendant after the counselor's report, and the Florida Department of Children and Families ultimately concluded that the defendant was not a threat because he was living with his mother, attending school, and seeing a counselor. 

Authorities charged the gunman with first-degree murder, and the case went to trial in September 2021 along with the case of an attack by the defendant against a jail officer. On October 20, 2021, the gunman pleaded guilty to all charges, including murder and attempted murder. On November 2, 2022, the gunman was sentenced to 34 consecutive life sentences without the possibility of parole, one life sentence for each of the victims murdered and wounded by the gunman.

Students from Stoneman Douglas were instrumental in helping organize nationwide student protests following the shooting, and in spurring the revision of Florida law, on March 4, 2018, to raise the legal rifle-owner age from 18 to 21, with a three-day wait.

Athletics 
The Marjory Stoneman Douglas Athletics Department operates programs in football, volleyball, lacrosse, softball, tennis, track, water polo, bowling, basketball, cheerleading, soccer, wrestling, swimming, cross country, and golf.

The cheerleading squad at the school received international attention in 2012 when its coach was fired in response to complaints from parents. Parents complained about being charged thousands of dollars for their children to participate in the program, and alleged that the coach mishandled the team's finances and encouraged bullying.

Academics 
Newsweek'''s 2009 national ranking of high schools rated Marjory Stoneman Douglas High School as No. 208 in the U.S., and No. 38 in Florida, which was the highest ranking of any school in Broward County.

Marjory Stoneman Douglas High School had a Florida Comprehensive Assessment Test (FCAT) school grade of "A" for the 2011–2012 academic school year.

 Extracurricular activities 
There are numerous clubs at Marjory Stoneman Douglas High School including DECA, speech and debate, Key Club, and cultural clubs including ISA (Indian Student Associations), Black Student Union Club, French Club, and Spanish club.

Drama Club
Several students in the Marjory Stoneman Douglas Drama Club wrote "Shine", a song memorializing the victims of the school shooting in 2018 and others who have experienced gun violence. It has been performed at various venues, including a nationally-broadcast CNN town hall, and at the March for Our Lives rally in Washington, D.C. on March 24, 2018. It has also been performed by other musical groups, such as the Badiene Magaziner Vocal Studio at the March for Our Lives rally in New York City on the same day. The drama club performed at the 2018 Tony Awards.

 Newspaper 
The Eagle Eye'' is the student-run news publication of Marjory Stoneman Douglas High School. They made international press for their reporting of the 2018 shooting and its aftermath. Two issues of the student newspaper were submitted for the Pulitzer Prize for their work covering student obituaries.

Winterguard
The Stoneman Douglas World Guard has made finals at WGI World Championships 9 times.

Demographics 
As of the 2017–2018 school year, the total student enrollment was 3,330. The ethnic makeup of the school was 57% White, 11% Black, 22% Hispanic, 7% Asian and 3% multiracial. 27% of the students were eligible for free or reduced cost lunch.

Notable alumni 

 Dave Aizer, television host, writer and producer
 Nick Bilton, journalist and author
 Vail Bloom, actress
 Karamo Brown, television host, reality television personality, author, and activist
 Alfonso Calderon, anti gun violence activist, March for Our Lives co-founder, school shooting survivor
 Mike Caruso, MLB player
 Jaclyn Corin, anti gun violence activist, March for Our Lives co-founder, school shooting survivor 
 Matt Deitsch, writer, film director, political advisor, freelance photographer
 Ryan Deitsch, anti gun violence activist, March for Our Lives co-founder, school shooting survivor
 Sam Deitsch (born 2003), author and gun control activist, school shooting survivor
 Aalayah Eastmond, activist
 Matt Fox, MLB player
 X González, anti gun violence activist, March for Our Lives co-founder, school shooting survivor
 Shayne Gostisbehere, NHL player
 Ian Grushka, musician and songwriter
 David Hogg, anti gun violence activist, March for Our Lives co-founder, school shooting survivor 
 Lauren Hogg, anti gun violence activist, March for Our Lives co-founder, school shooting survivor
 Kyle Kashuv, conservative activist, school shooting survivor
 Cameron Kasky, anti gun violence activist, March for Our Lives co-founder, school shooting survivor
 Steve Klein, musician
 Jesús Luzardo, MLB Player
 Jared Moskowitz, U.S. Congressman from Florida's 23rd congressional district
 Jordan Pundik, musician and songwriter
 Anthony Rizzo, MLB player
 Jackie Sandler, actress
 Cassie Scerbo, actress, singer and dancer
 Nicholas Thompson, professional golfer
 Alex Wind, anti gun violence activist, March for Our Lives co-founder, school shooting survivor
 Mark Zupan, wheelchair rugby player

References

External links 

 
 
 
 Student newspaper

Broward County Public Schools
High schools in Broward County, Florida
Public high schools in Florida
Stoneman Douglas High School shooting
Educational institutions established in 1990
1990 establishments in Florida